The Marlin Airport is a public municipal airport located and owned by the city of Marlin, Texas. The facility includes one runway that extends to over 3,000 feet long that is asphalt. The airport opened in 1960 and is about three miles northeast of Marlin, right next to Lake Marlin.

References

Marlin, Texas
Transportation in Falls County, Texas
Buildings and structures in Falls County, Texas